Nilsson Schmilsson is the seventh studio album by American singer Harry Nilsson, released by RCA Records in November 1971. It was Nilsson's most commercially successful work, producing three of his best-known songs. Among these was the number 1 hit "Without You", written by Pete Ham and Tom Evans of the group Badfinger. The album was the first of two Nilsson albums recorded in London and produced by Richard Perry.

"Jump into the Fire" and "Coconut", both written by Nilsson, also became hits. The album performed well at the 1973 Grammy Awards, earning a nomination for Album of the Year, while "Without You" won the Grammy for Best Male Pop Vocal Performance. In 2006, Nilsson Schmilsson was ranked number 84 on Pitchfork's "Top 100 Albums of the 1970s".  The album was ranked #281 in the 2020 revision of Rolling Stone's 500 Greatest Albums of All Time list.

Track listing

Personnel
According to the 1971 LP credits:

 Harry Nilsson – vocals; piano on 1, 5, 8, 10; Mellotron on 2, 4; organ on 3; harmonica on 8; electric piano on 9
 Jim Gordon – drums on 1, 2, 5, 7, 9; percussion on 7, 9
 Klaus Voormann – bass on 1, 5, 6, 8; rhythm guitar on 2, 9; acoustic guitar on 4
 Chris Spedding – guitar on 1, 5, 8, 9
 Herbie Flowers – bass on 2, 4, 7, 9
 John Uribe – acoustic guitar on 2, 4, 6; lead guitar on 2, 9

Additional personnel
 Henry Krein – accordion on 1
 Richard Perry – percussion on 1, Mellotron on 2
 Jim Price – trumpet on 1, 5; trombone on 1, 5; horn arrangements on 1, 5
 Jim Keltner – drums on 5, 6, 8
 Roger Coulam – organ on 5
 Bobby Keys – saxophone on 5
 Gary Wright – piano on 6, organ on 8
 Paul Buckmaster – string and horn arrangements on 6
 Roger Pope – drums on 7
 Caleb Quaye – guitar on 7
 Ian Duck – acoustic guitar on 7
 Jim Webb – piano on 9
 George Tipton – string and horn arrangements on 10

Technical
Robin Geoffrey Cable - engineer (Trident Studios)
Richie Schmitt – engineer (RCA Studios)
Phil Brown - additional engineer (Island Studios)
Acy Lehman – graphics
Dean Torrence – photography

Charts

Certifications

Awards

|-
| style="text-align:center;" rowspan="4"| 1973 Grammy Awards
| "Without You"
||Grammy Award for Best Male Pop Vocal Performance
| 
|-
| "Without You"
||Grammy Award for Record of the Year
| 
|-
| "Nilsson Schmilsson"
||Grammy Award for Album of the Year
| 
|-
| "Nilsson Schmilsson"
||Grammy Award for Best Engineered Album, Non-Classical
|

References

External links
Nilsson Schmilsson at The Harry Nilsson Web Pages
"Nilsoon Schmilsson Review on "Cool Album of the Day"

Harry Nilsson albums
1971 albums
Albums arranged by Paul Buckmaster
Albums arranged by George Tipton
Albums produced by Richard Perry
Albums recorded at Trident Studios
RCA Victor albums
Albums with cover art by Dean Torrence